Dryadocoris apicalis is a species of shield bugs of the family Pentatomidae.

Description

Distribution
This species can be found in France, Italy, Spain, Portugal, Canary Islands, Morocco, Algeria and in various sub-saharan countries.

References

External links
Biodiversidad Virtual
Le monde des insectes

Pentatomidae
Insects described in 1842
Hemiptera of Europe